Date and time notation in Vietnam describes methods of expressing date and time used in Vietnam.

Date 
In Vietnam, dates follow the "day month year" order. All-numeric dates can be written as:

 d/m/yyyy (9/1/2021)
 d-m-yyyy (9-1-2021)
 dd/mm/yyyy (09/01/2021)
 dd-mm-yyyy (09-01-2021)

A dot in the line (period or full stop) can also be used (i.e. 9.1.2021, 09.01.2021).

In the full form, the month name is alphanumeric. Example: "9 tháng 1 năm 2021". Leading zeros may also be used: "09 tháng 01 năm 2021".

Monday is the first day of the week and Sunday is the last day of the week.

The names of months and days are as follows:

Time 
Vietnam uses the 24-hour notations in writing; an "h" or ":" is used as separator, e.g. "13h15" or "13:15". Full hours can be written just with an "h", e.g. "6h" (not "6h00" or "06h00"). Transport timetables use it exclusively, as do legal documents and television schedules. It can also be used orally (e.g. the time 00:05 would be read as Không giờ năm phút ("zero hour, five minutes")).

The 12-hour notations is also used orally but instead of AM/PM, it's necessary to specify the place of the sun:

References

See also 

 Date format by country

Vietnamese culture
Vietnam